S series or Series-S or variation, may refer to:

Transportation
 Bedford S series, trucks
 Chevrolet S-series, pickup trucks
 GMC S-Series, school bus
 International S series, trucks
 International S series (bus chassis)
 S series (Toronto subway), rapid transit rolling stock
 Saturn S series, compact cars
 Waco S series, biplanes
 S series of BMW engines
 S series services of Calcutta State Transport Corporation
 S series, Meguro motorcycles
 S-series Toyota LiteAce, vans

Technology
 S-Series (rocket family), funded by the Japan Aerospace Exploration Agency
 Fujifilm FinePix S-series
 Minolta Vectis S series, cameras
 Lenovo IdeaPad S series
 Samsung Galaxy S series, smartphones and tablets
 Sony Vaio S series, netbooks
 Sony Walkman S Series, portable media players
 S series, Acer Aspire laptops
 Apple S series processors used in the Apple Watch
 S series, Lenovo ThinkPad laptops
 S series of HP ProBook, notebook computers
 Sony Ericsson S series, a series of cell phones
 S series Force10, network switches
 Xbox Series S, 4th generation Xbox videogame console from Microsoft

Other uses
 Ibanez S series, guitar
 S-series Dungeons & Dragons modules, four modules of the fantasy tabletop role-playing game
 S-Series of ILS specifications, specifications for integrated logistics support
 S series, supplement to the Official Journal of the European Union

See also

 R series (disambiguation)
 T series (disambiguation)
 Series (disambiguation)
 S (disambiguation)